Dante Hall Theater of the Arts is a theatre and cultural center in Atlantic City, New Jersey located in the Ducktown neighbourhood, which has traditionally been the city's Little Italy. It is now part of Stockton University.

Dante Hall Theater was originally built in 1926 by St. Michael's Catholic Church, and primarily served the predominantly Italian-American community as a church hall, school gymnasium, and community theatre. St. Michael’s closed its parish school in the late 1980s, leaving the building dormant. An eighteen-month, $3.5 million renovation, funded solely by the Casino Reinvestment Development Authority, was completed in October 2003 and renamed Dante Hall Theater of the Arts. In 2011, Stockton University took control of the theatre, which remains the property of the Roman Catholic Diocese of Camden.

See also
Carnegie Library Center, former public library also part of Stockton College
Stockton Island, former casino/hotel complex now part of Stockton

References 

Theatres completed in 1928
Buildings and structures in Atlantic City, New Jersey
Culture of Atlantic City, New Jersey
Education in Atlantic County, New Jersey
Neoclassical architecture in New Jersey
Beaux-Arts architecture in New Jersey
Stockton University
Theatres in New Jersey
Roman Catholic Diocese of Camden
1928 establishments in New Jersey